The Burlington Depot in Red Cloud, Nebraska, is a restoration of the station used by the Burlington and Missouri River Railroad (B & M) from 1897 to 1965. Now moved north from its original place near the tracks, the depot is one of the sites owned by the Willa Cather Foundation and includes a freight room, agent's office, waiting room, and sleeping quarters in its two stories. The presence of the depot and trains in Red Cloud greatly affected Willa Cather's life and literary work, and the depot is available for tours to anyone interested in learning more about the author. As part of the Willa Cather Thematic Group, it is listed on the National Register of Historic Places.

History as active station

The Burlington Depot was constructed by the Burlington and Missouri River Railroad, a company founded in Iowa. The federal government had encouraged the construction of railroad lines in Nebraska during the 1860s, offering a land grant aid to the Burlington and Missouri Railroad in 1864. However, due to the ongoing Civil War and the halt of other construction on the railroad, the Burlington and Missouri Railroad did not expand into Nebraska until 1870. Two years later, the railroad connected with the Union Pacific Railroad at Kearney, but in the next few years it would lay even more track across Nebraska. As the population increased in the Republican Valley (particularly in Bloomington, Red Cloud, Republican City, Alma City, and Arapahoe), the Burlington and Missouri Railroad came to believe that the area could support a railroad line and began further construction in 1878, the new line reaching Red Cloud in November of that year. Since its construction in 1897, the building and its surrounding rails have been subject to floods and fires.

Restoration

In 1965, the railroad sold the depot to a salvage company, whose owner (V. H. Fette of McCook) donated the building to the Willa Cather Foundation (then the Willa Cather Pioneer Memorial). Financially, it was a big project to take on since the depot had to be moved away from the tracks due to safety regulations and because it was in need of restoration. But many people were determined to make the depot, a place that served as inspiration in many of Willa Cather's works, accessible to the public. Efforts spanned across Nebraska, beginning with V. H. Fette's donation of the original building, then Mr. and Mrs. Ralph Makinster's (Red Cloud) gift of land for the depot's new site, Mr. and Mrs. John Quirk's (Hastings) grant of $5,000, and the assistance of many others.

After a foundation was poured at the new site, as much of the depot as could be saved was brought to its new home. The understructure had rotted, but the bricks of the platform and half of the tile on the floor in the waiting room were incorporated into the restoration. Original floor plans were used to make the building as authentic as possible. Soon, the Willa Cather Foundation realized more funds would be needed to complete the Burlington Depot: an estimated $11,750 in adjusting the walls, adding and repairing tin shingles, moving the staircase, removing and reapplying paint一among many other restoration efforts. Like many of the Burlington Railroad depots, the restored depot in Red Cloud was painted Burlington red, bringing color to the prairie in the winter that Willa Cather often described as a drab and dull monotony of tones. Helen Obitz, one of the founders of the Willa Cather Foundation and an antique collector, helped to furnish the Burlington Depot, supplying such items as a potbellied heating stove, a few railroad lanterns, and a Pullman stool. In 1969, a $25,000 grant from the Wood Charitable Fund was given to the Willa Cather Foundation for the Burlington Depot and for St. Juliana Falconieri Catholic Church. A year later, on April 18th, dedication ceremonies celebrated the opening of both sites. Fred B. Deines, then a vice president of the Burlington Railroad, cut the ribbon for the newly restored Burlington Depot.

In an issue of the Willa Cather Review (10.1), hope was expressed that the Burlington Depot would last eighty years or more. Today it is still standing, though restoration efforts recommenced in 2020.

Willa Cather
The Cather family came to Red Cloud via the railroad in 1883, when Willa Cather was 10. At the time the depot was a busy place, with eight passenger trains stopping each day and freights coming around day and night. Willa Cather enjoyed going to the depot with her friends and family for entertainment, walking down Red Cloud's wooden sidewalk—extending a mile from the center of town (the stairs down can still be seen today, though the rest of the boardwalk is gone). The activity of this depot, a source of entertainment in Willa's early life, became a prevailing inspiration in her works. Mildred R. Bennett, first president of the Willa Cather Pioneer Memorial, remarked that "Willa’s great emotional involvement with the railroad is in practically everything she wrote. ... To her the whistle of the train was a call to adventure."

References

External links
 Willa Cather Review at the Willa Cather Foundation
 Special Collections & Archives at the Willa Cather Foundation
 Willa Cather Archive at University of Nebraska-Lincoln

Former railway stations in Nebraska
Literary museums in the United States
Rail infrastructure in Nebraska